That's the Truth is the third studio album by Canadian country music singer Paul Brandt and is his final album to be released on Reprise Records. The album has been certified Gold by the CRIA. Four singles — "That's the Truth", "It's a Beautiful Thing", "That Hurts", and "The Sycamore Tree" — were released from the album; all but "That Hurts" charted on the Canadian RPM Country Tracks charts, where they reached numbers 1, 13, and 7, respectively. In addition, only "It's a Beautiful Thing" charted in the Top 40 in the U.S.

"It's a Beautiful Thing" was later recorded as "Love is a Beautiful Thing" by Phil Vassar in 2008, who released it as a single. Deana Carter as well as Brandt's wife Liz sang background vocals on several tracks of this album.

Track listing

Personnel
As listed in liner notes.

Musicians

Shawn Allan – drum programming
Joe Chemay – bass guitar, gang vocals
Eric Darken – percussion
Mark Douthit – saxophone
Dan Dugmore – pedal steel guitar, lap steel guitar, gang vocals
Chris Farren – acoustic guitar, mandolin, drum programming, background vocals
Larry Franklin – fiddle, gang vocals
Mike Haynes – trumpet
John Hobbs – keyboards, gang vocals
Jim Horn – saxophone
Chris McDonald – trombone
Terry McMillan – harmonica
Greg Morrow – drums, gang vocals
Tom Roady – percussion
Brent Rowan – electric guitar, gang vocals
Darrell Scott – acoustic guitar, mandolin, gang vocals
Denis Solee – saxophone
Biff Watson – acoustic guitar
Strings arranged by Ron Huff and performed by the Nashville String Machine (Carl Gorodetxky, conductor).

Additional background vocals

Liz Brandt
Paul Brandt
Tim Buppert
Deana Carter
LeAnn Phelan
Marty Slayton
Harry Stinson
Veritas (Directed by Fred Vaughn)

Chart performance

References

External links

Paul Brandt albums
1999 albums
Reprise Records albums
Albums produced by Chris Farren (country musician)